The 1933 Baltic Cup was held in Kaunas, Lithuania from 2 to 4 September 1933. It was the sixth time three Baltic states — Estonia, Latvia and Lithuania — came together to play a friendly tournament and determine the best team amongst them.

Controversy
Lithuania played Estonia first, the match was stopped due to darkness. On the next day Latvia beat Estonia. In the morning of the third day, before the Lithuania–Latvia match the hosts surprised officials with a tour to a local brewery. Estonian newspaper Päevaleht reported that the Finnish referee for the match was really jolly, but did horrible job, mostly favouring Lithuanian hosts. The match was stopped due to darkness and ended with a draw.

The rules demanded that at least two wins were necessary to win the championship. In the team meeting Latvia demanded that Lithuania–Estonia match should be re-played first. Latvia was hoping for an advantage against tired Lithuanian team in their match. Lithuania and Estonia disagreed noting that Latvia had won their match against Estonia, so Latvian win against Lithuania would grant Latvians the championship and end the tournament. Consensus was not reached and Latvian team left the same day. The championship was not awarded.

Results

Match abandoned at 1-1 due to darkness after first 15 minutes of extra time (105th min)

Match abandoned at 2-2 due to darkness

Final table

The final table is given, without the replayed match on September 5 (presumably based on an agreement between the countries prior to the 1935 edition).

Champion undecided due to disagreements over match times

Statistics

Goalscorers

See also
Balkan Cup
Nordic Football Championship

References

External links
 Tournament overview at EU-Football.info

1933
1933–34 in European football
1933 in Lithuanian football
1933 in Latvian football
1933 in Estonian football
1933